As one of the most successful clubs in Major League Baseball, the New York Yankees are also one of its oldest teams. Part of that success derives to its radio and television broadcasts that have been running beginning in 1939 when the first radio transmissions were broadcast from the old stadium, and from 1947 when television broadcasts began. They have been one of the pioneer superstation broadcasts when WPIX became a national superstation in 1978 and were the first American League team to broadcast their games on cable, both first in 1978 and later on in 1979, when Sportschannel NY (now MSG Plus) began broadcasting Yankees games to cable subscribers. Today, the team can be heard and/or seen in its gameday broadcasts during the baseball season on:

TV: YES Network, or Amazon Prime Video in New York
Radio: WFAN and WFAN-FM in New York; New York Yankees Radio Network; WADO (Spanish) (Cadena Radio Yankees)

Longest serving Yankee broadcasters (all-time with 10+ years)

Phil Rizzuto (40 yrs), John Sterling (34 yrs), Mel Allen (30 yrs), Michael Kay (31 yrs), Ken Singleton (25 yrs), Bobby Murcer (22 yrs), Paul O'Neill (21 yrs), Frank Messer (18 yrs), Bill White (18 yrs), Suzyn Waldman (18 yrs), John Flaherty (17 yrs), David Cone (16 yrs), Red Barber (13 yrs), Jim Kaat (13 yrs), Al Trautwig (12 yrs)

Broadcast announcers
Broadcasters assigned from the Yankees to cover World Series appearances nationally (1947–1978)
1947 – Mel Allen (radio via Mutual)
1949 – Mel Allen (radio via Mutual)
1950 – Mel Allen (radio via Mutual)
1951 – Mel Allen (radio via Mutual)
1952 – Mel Allen (TV via NBC)
1953 – Mel Allen (TV via NBC)
1955 – Mel Allen (TV via NBC)
1956 – Mel Allen (TV via NBC)
1957 – Mel Allen (TV via NBC)
1958 – Mel Allen (TV via NBC)
1960 – Mel Allen (TV via NBC)
1961 – Mel Allen (TV via NBC)
1962 – Mel Allen (TV via NBC)
1963 – Mel Allen (TV via NBC)
1964 – Phil Rizzuto (TV and radio via NBC)
1976 – Phil Rizzuto (TV via NBC); Bill White (radio via CBS)
1977 – Bill White (radio via CBS)
1978 – Bill White (radio via CBS)

Television Broadcasters by Year

Television Play-by-Play
Mel Allen β, 1939–1940, 1942, 1946–1964 (WPIX), 1979–1986 (SportsChannel)
Russ Hodges β, 1946–1948 (WPIX)
Curt Gowdy β, 1949–1950 (WPIX)
Jim Woods, 1953–1956 (WPIX)
Red Barber β, 1954–1966 (WPIX)
Phil Rizzuto, 1957–1996 (WPIX)
Jerry Coleman β, 1963–1969 (WPIX)
Joe Garagiola β, 1965–1967 (WPIX)
Frank Messer, 1968–1984 (WPIX)
Bob Gamere, 1970 (WPIX)
Bill White, 1971–1988 (WPIX)
Bobby Murcer, 1983–1984, 1991–1998 (WPIX), 1988 (SportsChannel), 1989 (MSG), 1999–2001 (FOX5), 2002–2008 (YES)
Spencer Ross, 1985 (WPIX), 1987 (SportsChannel)
George Grande, 1989–1990 (WPIX)
Greg Gumbel, 1989 (MSG) 
Tommy Hutton, 1989 (MSG)
Dewayne Staats, 1990–1994 (MSG)
Al Trautwig, 1990–2001 (MSG)
Paul Olden, 1994–1995 (WPIX)
Dave Cohen, 1995–1996 (MSG)
Ken Singleton, 1997–2001 (MSG), 2002–2021 (YES)
Michael Kay, 2002–present (YES)
Bob Lorenz, 2010–Present (YES)
Ryan Ruocco, 2015–Present (YES)

Television analyst
Dizzy Dean, 1950–1951 (WPIX)
Joe DiMaggio, 1952 (WPIX)
Joe Garagiola β, 1965–1967 (WPIX)
Jerry Coleman β, 1963–1969 (WPIX)
Whitey Ford, 1969–1971 (WPIX)
Fran Healy, 1979–1983 (SportsChannel)
Billy Martin, 1986–1987 (WPIX)
Ken Harrelson, 1987–1988 (SportsChannel)
Mickey Mantle, 1985–1988 (SportsChannel)
Bill White, 1971–1988 (WPIX)
Tom Seaver, 1989–1993 (WPIX)
Tony Kubek β, 1990–1994 (MSG)
Phil Rizzuto, 1957–1996 (WPIX)
Rick Cerone, 1996–1997 (WPIX)
Tommy John, 1998 (WPIX)
Tim McCarver β, 1999–2001 (WNYW)
Jim Kaat, 1986 (WPIX), 1995–2001 (MSG), 2002–2006 (YES)
Joe Girardi, 2004, 2007 (YES)
David Justice, 2005–2007 (YES)
Bobby Murcer, 1983–1984, 1991–1998 (WPIX), 1997–2001 (MSG), 2002–2008 (YES)
Tino Martinez, 2010 (YES)
Lou Piniella, 1989 (MSG), 2012–2013 (YES)
Al Leiter, 2006–2018 (YES)
David Cone, 2002, 2008–2009, 2011–present (YES)
John Flaherty, 2006–present (YES)
Paul O'Neill, 2002–present (YES)
Ken Singleton, 1997–2001 (MSG), 2002–2021 (YES)
Carlos Beltrán, 2022–present (YES)
Cameron Maybin, 2022–present (YES)

β - indicates Ford C. Frick Award winner

Radio
Longest serving Yankee radio broadcasters (all-time with 10+ years)

John Sterling (33 yrs), Phil Rizzuto (30 yrs), Mel Allen (22 yrs), Frank Messer (18 yrs), Suzyn Waldman (17 yrs), Beto Villa (16 yrs), Bill White (16 yrs), Red Barber (13 yrs), Michael Kay (10 yrs)

Radio play-by-play and color commentators 
Garnett Marks, 1939
Arch McDonald β, 1939
Mel Allen β, 1939–1940, 1942, 1946–1964
J.C. Flippen, 1940
Connie Desmond, 1942
Don Dunphy, 1944
Bill Slater, 1944–1945
Al Helfer β, 1945
Russ Hodges β, 1946–1948
Curt Gowdy β, 1949–1950
Art Gleeson, 1951–1952
Bill Crowley, 1951–1952
Joe E. Brown, 1953
Jim Woods, 1953–1956
Red Barber β, 1954–1966
Phil Rizzuto, 1957–1986
Jerry Coleman β, 1963–1969
Joe Garagiola β, 1965–1967
Frank Messer, 1968–1985
Bob Gamere, 1970
Bill White, 1971–1986
Dom Valentino, 1975
Fran Healy, 1978–1981
John Gordon, 1982–1985 (Pre and postgame only, 1986)
Bobby Murcer, 1986
Spencer Ross, 1986
Hank Greenwald, 1987–1988
Tommy Hutton, 1987–1988
John Sterling, 1989–present
Jay Johnstone, 1989–1990
Joe Angel, 1991
Michael Kay, 1992–2001
Charley Steiner, 2002–2004
Suzyn Waldman, 2005–present
Beto Villa, 1997–2013 en Español
Francisco Rivera, 2005–present en Español
Felix DeJesus, 2006–present en Español
Rickie Ricardo, 2014–present en Español, 2020–present (acting, relief PBP presenter for Stering)
Ryan Ruocco, 2019 (acting, relief PBP presenter for Sterling)
Chris Carrino, 2019 (acting, relief PBP presenter for Sterling)

β - indicates Ford C. Frick Award winner

Broadcast outlets

Radio stations
WABC/WCBS: 1939–1940, 1961–1966, 2002–2013
WOR: 1942
WINS: 1944–1957, 1978–1980
WMGM/WHN: 1958–1960, 1967–1970
WMCA: 1971–1977
WABC: 1981–2001
WFAN–WFAN-FM: 2014–present
WADO: 2010–present (Spanish)

Television stations
The Yankees' New York City flagship station has been:
WABD/WNYW: 1947–1951; 1999–2001
WCBS-TV: 2002–2004
WWOR-TV: 2005–2014
WPIX: 1951–1998; 2015–2021

Outside of New York City, over-the-air television broadcasts can often be seen on:
WCTX "My TV 9" New Haven/Hartford
WCWN "The CW 15" Albany (2013–)
WNYO-TV "My TV" Buffalo
WHAM-TV, WHAM-DT2 (The CW Rochester) Rochester
WSTM-DT2 "CW6", WSTM-TV "NBC 3" Syracuse
WQMY Williamsport/Scranton/Wilkes Barre
WPNY-LD Utica

Cable television
SportsChannel New York 1979–1988
MSG Network 1989–2001
YES Network 2002–current

Streaming television 
Amazon Prime Video 2020–present

Radio Network 

WFAN and WFAN-FM are flagships for a 52 station radio network spanning 14 states.

See also 
 List of current Major League Baseball announcers

Notes

References 

Halberstam, David "Sports on NY Radio", 1999.  

 
New York Yankees
CBS Sports
SportsChannel
Madison Square Garden Sports
YES Network
Bally Sports
CBS Radio Sports
Broadcasters